Anders is a male name in Scandinavian languages and Fering North Frisian, an equivalent of the Greek Andreas ("manly") and the English Andrew. It originated from Andres via metathesis.

In Sweden, Anders has been one of the most common names for many centuries, earliest attested in 1378. It was common for priests and farmers during medieval times. According to Statistics Sweden, as of 31 December 2002 it ranks 4th among the male names. The great frequency of this name at the point in time (around 1900) when patronymics were converted into family names is the reason why 1 out of every 30 Swedes today is called Andersson.

The name day of Anders in the Scandinavian calendar is 30 November, and in the old peasant superstition that day was important for determining what the Christmas weather would be. If it was very cold on 30 November there would be much sleet on Christmas (and vice versa).

In Denmark Donald Duck's name is Anders And.

The Fering name Anders may have been borrowed from the Danish version.

People

Given name

A–E
 Anders Aarum (born 1974), Norwegian jazz pianist
 Anders Aalborg (1914–2000), Canadian teacher and politician
 Anders Ahlgren (1888–1976), Swedish Greco-Roman wrestler
 Anders Andersen (1912–2006), Danish politician
 Anders Antonsen (born 1997), Danish badminton player
 Anders Anundsen (born 1975), Norwegian politician
 Anders Aplin (born 1991), Singapore football player
 Anders Arborelius (born 1949), Swedish Roman Catholic cardinal
 Anders Askevold (1834–1900), Norwegian painter
 Anders August (born 1978), Danish screenwriter
 Anders Aukland (born 1972), Norwegian cross-country skier
 Anders Bjork, American NHL player for the Buffalo Sabres
 Anders Björklund (born 1945), Swedish neuroscientist
 Anders Björler (born 1973), Swedish musician and songwriter
 Anders Blume (born in 1985), Danish CS:GO commentator
 Anders Behring Breivik (born 1979), Norwegian terrorist and right-wing extremist
 Anders Boesen (born 1976), Danish badminton player
 Anders Brännström (born 1957), Swedish Army major general
 Anders Callert (born 1965), Swedish Army major general
 Anders Carlsson (ice hockey) (born 1960), "Masken", Swedish ice hockey player
 Anders Celsius (1701–1744), Swedish astronomer
 Anders Danielsen Lie (born 1979), Norwegian actor, musician and medical doctor
 Anders Eklund (boxer) (1957–2010), Swedish boxer
 Anders Eriksson (born 1975), Swedish ice hockey player

F–L
 Anders Fannemel (born 1991), Norwegian ski jumper
 Anders Frandsen (1960-c. 2012), Danish actor and musician, Danish representative in the 1991 Eurovision Song Contest
 Anders Fridén (born 1973), Swedish death metal singer for the band In Flames
 Anders Gärderud (born 1946), Swedish steeplechase runner
 Anders Abraham Grafström (1790–1870), Swedish poet and historian
 Anders Hedberg (born 1951), Swedish pioneering ice hockey player
 Anders Hejlsberg (born 1960), Danish software engineer
 Anders Holm, American writer and one of the stars and creators of the Comedy Central show Workaholics
 Anders Holmertz (born 1968), Swedish retired swimmer, twice freestyle world champion
 Anders Jacobsen (ski jumper) (born 1985), Norwegian ski jumper
 Anders Järryd (born 1961), Swedish former tennis doubles player, winner of eight Grand Slam titles
 Anders Kaliff (born 1963), Swedish archaeologist
 Anders Lange (1904–1974), Norwegian politician
 Anders Langlands, visual effects supervisor
 Anders Lee (born 1990), American ice hockey player for the New York Islanders
 Anders Limpar (born 1965), Swedish footballer
 Anders Lindegaard (born 1984), Danish footballer
 Anders Linderoth (born 1950), Swedish professional football player and coach
 Anders Lindström (born 1969), Swedish rock guitarist and pianist
 Anders Lindström (born 1955), Swedish Army officer
 Anders Lustgarten, British playwright
 Anders Olson Lysne (1764-1803), Norwegian rebel leader

M–Z
 Anders Nilsen (disambiguation), multiple people
 Anders Örne (1881–1956), Swedish politician
 Anders Österberg (born 1981), Swedish politician
 Anders Holch Povlsen (born 1972), Danish billionaire, CEO and sole owner of the international retail clothing chain Bestseller
 Anders Sandøe Ørsted (1778–1860), Danish politician and jurist, Prime Minister of Denmark (1853–1854)
 Anders Sandøe Ørsted (botanist) (1816–1872), Danish botanist, mycologist, zoologist and marine biologist, nephew of the prime minister
 Anders Rapp (1927–1998), Swedish geographer
 Anders Fogh Rasmussen (born 1953), Danish politician, Secretary General of NATO
 Anders Södergren (born 1977), Swedish cross-country skier
 Anders Svensson (bandy) (born 1975), Swedish bandy player
 Anders Svensson (canoeist) (born 1977), Swedish canoer
 Anders Svensson (footballer, born 1976), Swedish footballer
 Anders Svensson (footballer, born 1939) (1939–2007), Swedish footballer
 Anders Sunesen (c. 1167–1228), Danish archbishop
 Anders Erikson Sparrman (1748–1820), Swedish naturalist and abolitionist
 Anders Szalkai (born 1970), Swedish retired long-distance runner
 Anders Thunborg (1934–2004), Swedish politician and diplomat
 Anders Wijkman (born 1944), Swedish politician
 Anders Zorn (1860–1920), Swedish painter, sculptor and printmaker

Middle name 
 Paul Anders Ogren (born 1951), American carpenter, farmer, and politician
 David Anders Holt (born 1981), known professionally as David Anders, American television and stage actor

Surname 
 Allison Anders (born 1954), American film and television director
 Andrea Anders (born 1975), American actress
 Andy Anders (born 1956), Louisiana state representative
 Benny Anders (born 1963), American basketball player
 Christian Anders (born 1945), Austrian singer and composer
 Ernst Anders (1845–1911), German painter
 Eryk Anders (born 1987), American mixed martial artist
 Frank L. Anders (1875–1966), U.S. Army soldier awarded the Medal of Honor
 Günther Anders (1902–1992), German thinker
 Günther Anders (cinematographer) (1908–1977), German cinematographer
 Merry Anders (1932–2012), American actress
 Peter Anders (tenor) (1908–1954), German operatic tenor
 Rob Anders (born 1972), Canadian politician
 Thomas Anders (born 1963), stage name of German singer Bernd Weidung
 William Anders (born 1933), Apollo 8 astronaut, former U.S. Air Force officer, and businessman
 Władysław Anders (1892–1970), Polish general and politician

Stage name 
 Anders (singer), Canadian R&B singer and songwriter

Fictional characters 
 Anders (Dragon Age), a character in the Dragon Age video game series
 Andurs, a Nord priest of Arkay, and Anders (deceased bandit), characters in The Elder Scrolls V: Skyrim, a game heavily influenced by Scandinavian culture
 Captain Leslie Anders, supporting character in the 1968 movie ”Ice Station Zebra”, played by the actor Jim Brown.
 Joseph Anders, a character in the U.S. TV series Dynasty and its reboot

References

Scandinavian masculine given names
Danish masculine given names
Norwegian masculine given names
Swedish masculine given names
Surnames from given names